Santa Maria la Real (Saint Mary the Royal) can refer to a number of places in Spain, including:

Cathedrals
Almudena Cathedral, Madrid
Pamplona Cathedral

Churches
Santa María la Real, Aranda de Duero
Santa María la Real, Olite
Santa María la Real, Sangüesa
Santa María la Real, Tanes, Caso, Asturias

Monasteries
Monastery of Santa María la Real (Palencia), Aguilar de Campoo
Monastery of Santa María la Real, Fitero, Navarre

, Villamayor de los Montes, Castile and León
Santa María la Real de Irache, Ayegui, Navarre
Monastery of Iranzu, or Royal Monastery of Saint Mary of Iranzu, Abárzuza, Navarre
Santa María la Real de Las Huelgas, Burgos
Monastery of Santa María la Real de las Huelgas, Valladolid, Duero

Santa María la Real of Nájera, La Rioja
Monastery of Santa María la Real in Obona, Tineo, Asturias
Santa María de la Oliva, Carcastillo, Navarre

St. Bernard de Clairvaux Church, Sacramenia, Segovia

Towns
Santa María la Real de Nieva, Province of Segovia